Michael Sutherland (born June 25, 1971 in Ottawa, Ontario) is a former professional Canadian football offensive lineman who played ten seasons for four teams in the Canadian Football League. Sutherland is now an analyst on RDS television and broadcaster on Ottawa radio stations CFRA and TSN 1200.

References

1971 births
Living people
Players of Canadian football from Ontario
Canadian football offensive linemen
Canadian football people from Ottawa
Saskatchewan Roughriders players
Montreal Alouettes players
Winnipeg Blue Bombers players
Ottawa Renegades players
Northern Illinois Huskies football players